Tell is a 2014 crime thriller directed by J.M.R. Luna and starring Katee Sackhoff, Jason Lee and Milo Ventimiglia. Written by actor/screenwriter Timothy Williams, it was produced by Haven Entertainment, distributed by Orion Pictures, and was released on December 4.

Plot
Ethan Tell is a small time crook who makes a big-time score when he steals 1 million dollars from a bank job that had been planned by his brother-in-law. Ironically, his life radically changes for the worse when he discovers that stealing the money was the easy part, as his wife shoots him after the police follow him home. Tell is subsequently arrested and sentenced to three years in prison when he continually claims that the money was destroyed in a fire.

Cast
Milo Ventimiglia as Tell
Katee Sackhoff as Beverly
Jason Lee as Ray
Robert Patrick as Ashton
Alan Tudyk as Morton
John Michael Higgins as Huffman
Faizon Love as Dwight Johnson
Oscar Nunez as Father Jack

References

External links
 
 

2014 crime thriller films
2014 films
American crime thriller films
Orion Pictures films
2010s English-language films
2010s American films